Dame Mary Louise Webster,  (née Whitty; 19 June 1865 – 29 May 1948), known professionally as May Whitty and later, for her charity work, Dame May Whitty, was an English stage and film actress. She was one of the first two women entertainers to become a Dame. The British actors' union Equity was established in her home. After a successful career she moved over to Hollywood films at the age of 72. She went to live in the United States, where she remained for the remainder of her life, appearing in films.

Background
Whitty was born in Liverpool, England, to William Alfred Whitty (circa 1837–1876), a newspaper proprietor, and Mary Louisa (née Ashton, circa 1837–1894). Her grandfather was Michael James Whitty, Chief Constable in Liverpool and founder of the Liverpool Daily Post. She made her first stage appearance in Liverpool in 1881, later moving to London to appear in the West End. 

She married the actor-manager Ben Webster on 3 August 1892 in St Giles's Parish Church, London. In 1895 they visited the United States, where Whitty appeared on Broadway. Their first child, a son, died at birth. Their only surviving child, a daughter born in New York in 1905, Margaret Webster, was a producer who held dual US and UK citizenship. She was chair of the Actresses' Franchise League (AFL).

Whitty's stage career continued for the rest of her life. In March 1910, she made her transition to middle-aged and elderly character roles, playing Amelia Madras in Harley Granville-Barker's four-act comedy The Madras House. During World War I she was active in the AFL, working there to help organize the Women's Emergency Corps. In March 1922, she played the role of Mrs. Bennet before the Queen in a benefit performance of Pride and Prejudice. She acted opposite her husband, who played Mr. Darcy.

Honours 
In the 1918 New Year Honours, she was made a Dame Commander of the Order of the British Empire (DBE, gazetted under her legal married name Mary Louise Webster) in recognition of her charitable work during the First World War for the Three Arts Women's Employment Fund and the British Women's Hospitals Committee. She was the first stage and film actress to receive a damehood, along with the opera singer Nellie Melba, who was also thus honoured in 1918.

Film career and death

Whitty made her Hollywood film debut at the age of 72, recreating her 1935 stage role in the Hollywood film Night Must Fall (1937), which also starred Robert Montgomery and Rosalind Russell. She received an Oscar nomination. This led to several supporting roles in films, including that of the vanishing lady, Miss Froy, in Alfred Hitchcock's The Lady Vanishes (1938).

In 1939, Whitty permanently moved  to the United States - although she never became a US citizen; and appeared both on stage and in Hollywood films, usually playing wealthy dowagers. It was one such part, as Lady Beldon in Mrs. Miniver (1942), that brought her a second Academy Award nomination for Best Supporting Actress.

She continued to act for the remainder of her life, and died on 29 May 1948 in Beverly Hills, California, from cancer at the age of 82; her husband had died the previous year during surgery. She is commemorated with a plaque at St Paul's parish church in Covent Garden, London, alongside the plaque to her husband.

Stage roles
Dates are of the first performance.

Filmography

Enoch Arden (1914) as Miriam Lane
The Little Minister (1915) as Nanny Webster
Colonel Newcombe, the Perfect Gentleman (1920) as Mrs. Mackenzie
Keep Your Seats, Please (1936) as Aunt Georgina Withers (uncredited)
Night Must Fall (1937) as Mrs. Bramson
Conquest (1937) as Maria Letizia Buonaparte
I Met My Love Again (1938) as Aunt William
Parnell (1938, TV movie) as Aunt Caroline
The Lady Vanishes (1938) as Miss Froy
Mary Rose (1939, TV movie) as Mrs. Morland
The Royal Family of Broadway (1939, TV movie) as Fanny Cavendis
Rake's Progress (1939, TV movie) as Mrs. Mead, Wilkes's mother-in-law
Raffles (1939) as Lady Melrose
Return to Yesterday (1940) as Mrs. Truscott
A Bill of Divorcement (1940) as Aunt Hester Fairfield
One Night in Lisbon (1941) as Florence
Suspicion (1941) as Mrs. Martha McLaidlaw
Mrs. Miniver (1942) as Lady Beldon
Thunder Birds (1942) as Lady Jane Stackhouse
Forever and a Day (1943) as Mrs. Lucy Trimble
Slightly Dangerous (1943) as Baba
Crash Dive (1943) as Grandmother
The Constant Nymph (1943) as Lady Constance Longborough
Stage Door Canteen (1943) as herself
Lassie Come Home (1943) as Dally
Flesh and Fantasy (1943) as Lady Pamela Hardwick (Episode 2)
Madame Curie (1943) as Madame Eugene Curie
Gaslight (1944) as Miss Bessie Thwaites
The White Cliffs of Dover (1944) as Nanny
My Name Is Julia Ross (1945) as Mrs. Hughes
Devotion (1946) as Lady Thornton
Green Dolphin Street (1947) as Mother Superior
This Time for Keeps (1947) as Grandmother Cambaretti
If Winter Comes (1947) as Mrs. Perch
The Sign of the Ram (1948) as Clara Brastock
The Return of October (1948) as Aunt Martha Grant (final film role)

See also

List of actors with Academy Award nominations

References

Works consulted

Further reading

External links

 Stage performances listed in Theatre Archive University of Bristol
 May Whitty photo gallery at NY Public Library Billy Rose Collection

1865 births
1948 deaths
19th-century British actresses
British stage actresses
Actresses awarded damehoods
Actresses from Liverpool
Deaths from cancer in California
Dames Commander of the Order of the British Empire
English expatriates in the United States
English film actresses
English silent film actresses
English stage actresses
Metro-Goldwyn-Mayer contract players
20th-century English actresses
British expatriate actresses in the United States
19th-century English women
19th-century English people